Phidippus pacosauritus is a species of jumping spider found in Mexico. It was first described by G. B. Edwards in 2020.

References

Salticidae
Spiders described in 2020

Endemic spiders of Mexico